Prilepnica or Përlepnica, is a village in the Kosovo Pomoravlje region of eastern Kosovo. The village is situated by the old mountainous road leading up to Novo Brdo, some 7 km from Gjilan.

History 
The village was inhabited in the Middle Ages. There are ruins of an old church. Prince Lazar of Serbia (r. 1373–1389) was born in Prilepac near Boževce, which according to tradition was Prilepnica. The village was mentioned in the Ottoman defter of 1455 of the Vlk Vilayet (Vilayet of Vuk), encompassing most of Vuk Branković's former territory. At that time the village was populated exclusively by Serbs, on the forehead with priest, living in 62 households.

The village is mentioned under the name Prilěpnica.

During the Kosovo War, on 6 April 1999, Yugoslav forces entered the village and ordered the population to leave, in order to set up mines. On 13 April, they were again asked to evacuate, and the next day, houses were set on fire. A Serb was murdered on the Prilepnica road on 28 August.

Some old walls were found at the time a dam was built, but archaeologists have not yet studied the site. In old houses and during construction of new houses, items such as ancient bottles and swords are often found. Although the objects remain unidentified, some have been kept as possibly valuable.

Anthropology
Albanian families include: Kalaushi, Shabani, Muja, Zubaku, Hima, Syla, Tefiqi, Dankaj, Emini, Rexhepi, and others. These families settled from the Sanjak of Niš during and after the Serbian–Ottoman War (1876–78).

See also
 Prilepnica (river)
 Prilepnica Lake

Notes

References

Bibliography 
http://www.scribd.com/doc/6055186/Qka-e-Ben-Te-Dallueshme-Perlepnicen

External links 
 Prilepnica in OpenStreetMap

Villages in Gjilan
Medieval Serbian sites in Kosovo